Haematobosca is a genus of biting true flies of the family Muscidae.

Species
H. atripalpis (Bezzi, 1895)
H. aurata Pont & Mihok, 2000
H. croceicornis Pont & Dsouri, 2009
H. praedatrix (Enderlein, 1928)
H. augustifrons (Malloch, 1932)
H. hirtifrons (Malloch, 1932)
H. latifrons (Malloch, 1932)
H. sanguinolenta (Austen, 1909)
H. uniseriata (Malloch, 1932)
H. alcis (Snow, 1891)
H. atripalpis (Bezzi, 1895)
H. sanguisugens (Austen, 1909)
H. squalida (Grünberg, 1913)
H. wooffi (Zumpt, 1969)
H. zuluensis (Zumpt, 1950)
H. kangwagyei (Zumpt, 1967)
H. ryszardi (Draber-Monko, 1966)
H. stimulans (Meigen, 1824)

References

Muscidae
Diptera of Europe
Diptera of Africa
Brachycera genera
Taxa named by Mario Bezzi